Maha Sawa or Trà Hòa Bố Để was a king of Champa from 1342 to 1360.  When his brother-in-law Che Anan died in 1342, Tra Hoa claimed the throne.

Che Anan's legitimate heir, Jamo (or Che Mo), was angered by this and later sought help from the country Trần dynasty
.

References 

Kings of Champa
Hindu monarchs
1360 deaths
Year of birth unknown
14th-century Vietnamese monarchs
Vietnamese monarchs